The Société d'Exploitation des Mines d'Or de Sadiola S.A (SEMOS) project is an open-pit gold mine situated near Sadiola, in the Kayes Region of Mali. The operation was jointly owned by AngloGold Ashanti and IAMGOLD, who each had an effective holding of 41%, while the Government of Mali owned the remaining 18%. The International Finance Corporation originally held 6% of the mine put sold this share equally to AGA and IAMGOLD in December 2009.

Apart from Sadiola and the nearby Yatela Mine, AGA also operated the Morila Gold Mine in Mali. The production of its mines in Mali contributed 8% to the company's overall production in 2008.

History
Mining in this region of Mali, according to old workings, dates back at least 1,000 years and written records confirm that small scale mining was carried out there for most of the past 300 years. From 1987 onward, the Government of Mali carried out exploration activities in the area, funded by the European Development Fund.

Non-government mining exploration in the area began in 1990 with the Société d'Exploitation des Mines d'Or de Sadiola (SEMOS) project by a predecessor company of the Canadian mid-tier mining company IAMGOLD, and, in 1992 Anglo American entered into a joint venture with IAMGOLD to develop the project. Anglo American eventually transferred its rights to AngloGold, which, in 2004, became AngloGold Ashanti Ltd (AGA). Development of the mine began in 1994 and it opened in 1996.

In 2009, SEMOS employed just over 1,500 people. The development of the mine was however not seen as a positive project by all, as local farmers complained that they had not been adequately compensated for loss of land or loss of cattle poisoned from a cyanide spill. Clean drinking water for livestock in the area, however, gets pumped from boreholes within the mine. Electricity is also provided by SEMOS free of charge to the local village (Sadiola). Further exploration drilling took place in the area surrounding Sadiola, and new pits were developed. 

The mine was jointly owned by AGA (41%), IAMGOLD (41%) and the Government of Mali(18%), and operated by AGA until December 2020. Allied Gold Corp (AGC), a private company, bought out IAMGOLD & AGA interests in the SEMOS project (80%) and now operates the mine with the Republic of Mali now owning (20%).

Production
Production figures of the recent past were:

* grams per tonne (g/t) of milled ore
** TCC total cash cost
*** AISC all-in sustainable costs as per the 2013 Word Gold Council's formal guidelines metric

References

External links 
 AngloGold Ashanti website
 IAMGOLD website
 THE SADIOLA HILL GOLD PROJECT International Finance Corporation website
 Sadiola mine (MLI-00035) Secretariat of the African, Caribbean and Pacific Group of States website

Gold mines in Mali
Surface mines in Mali
AngloGold Ashanti
Kayes Region
1996 establishments in Mali